This list of Iraqis includes people who were born in Iraq and people who are of Iraqi ancestry, who are significantly notable for their life and/or work.

Archaeologists

 Donny George Youkhanna
 Taha Baqir
 Zainab Bahrani (born 1962), an Iraqi professor of Ancient Near Eastern Art and Archaeology at Columbia University
 Hormuzd Rassam (1826 – 16 September 1910), native Assyrian Assyriologist, British diplomat and traveller who made a number of important discoveries, including the clay tablets that contained the Epic of Gilgamesh, the world's oldest literature.

Artists

 Wijdan Ali, painter, was born in Baghdad, Iraq. She is the ex-wife of Prince 'Ali bin Naif of Jordan.
 Mohammed Ghani Hikmat (1929 – September 12, 2011), Iraqi sculptor and artist credited with creating some of Baghdad's highest profile sculptures and monuments. His best known works include the Victory Arch and two statues of Queen Scheherazade and King Shahryar, located on Aby Nuwas Street.
 Jananne Al-Ani, artist
 Zahroun Amara, world renowned Mandaean niello silversmith. People that are known to have owned his silver nielloware include Stanley Maude, Winston Churchill, Bahrain royal family, Egyptian King Farouk, Iraqi royal family including kings Faisal I and Ghazi, and British royal family including the Prince of Wales who became Edward VIII.
 Layla Al-Attar, painter
 Yitzhak Yamin, Israeli painter and sculptor, (born in Iraq of Iraqi Jewish heritage)
 Suad al-Attar, painter
 Jawad Saleem (1919 – 1961) (Arabic: جواد سليم), Iraqi sculptor born in Ankara (Turkey) in 1919, one of the most famous Iraqi artists of all time. 
 Omran Al-Kaysi, artist and historian
 Sama Raena Alshaibi, artist
 Jaber Alwan, artist
 Jasim An-Najafi, (1950) (Arabic: جاسم النجفي), Iraqi senior calligrapher born in Najaf, Iraq.
 Khalil al-Zahawi, calligrapher
 Halla Ayla, Iraqi-American artist
 Raad Ghantous, interior designer
 Hayv Kahraman, Iraqi-American artist
 Farouk Kaspaules, Iraqi-born Canadian artist
 Toba Khedoori, artist
 Nedim Kufi, artist
 Hassan Massoudy, calligrapher
 Rashad Salim, Iraqi-German artist
 Tamara Salman, design director
 Wafaa Bilal, born in 1966 Najaf, Iraq. He is an Iraqi American artist, a former professor at the School of the Art Institute of Chicago and currently an assistant professor at the Tisch School of the Arts at New York University.

Artists of Iraqi origin 

 Anish Kapoor (born 12 March 1954), Indian sculptor. Born in Bombay to Hindu father and a Jewish mother whose family immigrated from Baghdad when she was a few months old.
 Gerry Judah (born 30 July 1951), British artist and designer. Judah's maternal and paternal grandparents came from Baghdad to settle in the already established Baghdadi Jewish community in India and Burma.

Architects 

 Hisham N. Ashkouri
 Rifat Chadirji (born December 6, 1926, in Baghdad), Iraqi architect and author
 Zaha Hadid, winner of numerous awards including Thomas Jefferson Medal in Architecture (2007)
 Hussain Ali Abbass Harba, Iraqi architect and designer
 Kanan Makiya (born 1949), architect, academic and critic
 Mohamed Makiya (1914–2015), architect, urban planner and author
Manhal Al-Habbobi (born 1970), Iraqi architect and former Mayor of Baghdad
Basil Bayati - architect and designer

Fashion designers
 Misha Nonoo, American-based fashion designer, best known for her eponymous line of women's ready-to-wear.
 Reem Alasadi, Iraqi-born British fashion designer
 Salim al-Shimiri
 Hana Sadiq
 Amir Slama, fashion designer, stylist and owner of the most famous beach fashion brand Rosa Chá in Brazil.
 Zeena Zaki, fashion designer

Business people and entrepreneurs
 Nadhmi Auchi, British-Iraqi businessman, founder and chairman of General Mediterranean Holding (GMH), a conglomerate of 120 companies worldwide. In the Sunday Times Rich List 2008 ranking of the wealthiest people in the UK he was placed 27th with estimated fortune of £2,150 million.
Zadik Bino (born 1943), Iraqi-born Israeli billionaire businessman.
Shlomo Eliahu (born 1936), Baghdad-born Israeli businessman, billionaire, and former member of the Knesset
 Calouste Gulbenkian (23 March 1869 – 20 July 1955), Armenian businessman and philanthropist.
Huda Kattan, Iraqi-American, founder and CEO of Huda Beauty
 Nemir Kirdar, Iraqi-born businessman (President, founder and CEO of Investcorp)
 Khalid Muhmood, director of Apollo Education and Training
 Sharif Hikmat Nashashibi, co-founder and chairman of Arab Media Watch
 Samuel Nalo, businessman, hijacker, and burglar
 Selim Zilkha, entrepreneur, founder of Mothercare, one of the United Kingdom's largest retail chains.
 Awn Hussain Al Khashlok, Iraqi businessman, CEO of Al Khashlok Group. Founder of Al Baghdadia Media Group.

Business people and entrepreneurs of Iraqi descent

 Marcus Samuel, 1st Viscount Bearsted (5 November 1853 – 17 January 1927), founder of the Shell Transport and Trading Company, which later took the name Royal Dutch Shell. Samuel was born into a Baghdadi Jewish family in Whitechapel, London.
 Samuel Samuel (7 April 1855 – 23 October 1934), businessman and Conservative Party politician. He sat in the House of Commons from 1913 to 1934. Samuel, born into a Baghdadi Jewish family. He founded Samuel Samuel & Co in Yokohama, Japan, in partnership with his elder brother Marcus Samuel. 
 Walter Samuel, 2nd Viscount Bearsted, Colonel Walter Horace Samuel, 2nd Viscount Bearsted MC (13 March 1882 – 8 November 1948) was a British peer and former Chairman of the Shell Transport and Trading Company. He was also a prominent art collector and a philanthropist. Samuel was the son of Marcus Samuel, 1st Viscount Bearsted.
 Marcus Samuel, 3rd Viscount Bearsted, Major Marcus Richard Samuel, 3rd Viscount Bearsted TD DL (1 June 1909 – 15 October 1986) was a British peer and a director of numerous companies, including Lloyds Bank. Samuel was the son of Walter Samuel, 2nd Viscount Bearsted. 
 Peter Samuel, 4th Viscount Bearsted, Major Peter Montefiore Samuel, 4th Viscount Bearsted MC TD (9 December 1911 – 9 June 1996) was a British peer and former Deputy Chairman of Shell Transport and Trading.
 Sassoon David Sassoon (1832–1867), Indian-born English businessman, banker and philanthropist.
 Sir Sassoon David, 1st Baronet (11 December 1849 – 27 September 1926), member of the community of Baghdadi Jews that lived in Bombay. A prominent businessman, he was the lead promoter of the Bank of India, founded in 1906.
 Sir Edward Sassoon, 2nd Baronet, of Kensington Gore (20 June 1856 – 24 May 1912), British businessman and politician.
 Sir Percival David, 2nd Baronet (Bombay, 21 July 1892 – 9 October 1964), important collector of Chinese porcelain. The Percival David Foundation of Chinese Art is a collection of Chinese ceramics and related items in London, England. 
 Naim Dangoor CBE (born April 1914), British-nationalised Jewish Iraqi refugee, engineer, entrepreneur and philanthropist. 
 Jack Dellal (2 October 1923 – 28 October 2012), London-based property investor known as 'Black Jack' reportedly worth GBP £480 million in 2009.
 Zadik Bino, Israeli businessman of Iraqi Jewish descent. He was ranked Israel's 24th richest man in 2006 by Forbes.
 Albert Abdullah David Sassoon, Sir Albert Abdullah David Sassoon, 1st Baronet, KCB, CSI, (25 July 1818 – 24 October 1896) was a British Indian businessman and philanthropist. Sir Albert was born on 25 July 1818 in Baghdad.
 Shai Agassi, Founder and Chairman of Better Place
 Nemir A. Kirdar, Iraqi businessman and financier, he is the executive chairman & CEO of Investcorp, a private equity investment group operating out of New York, London and Bahrain. Kirdar currently lives in London. Kirdar was born to a Turkmen family in Kirkuk, Iraq, to a family prominent in the politics of the late Ottoman Empire and interwar Iraq.
 Shlomo Eliahu (born 18 January 1936 in Baghdad, Iraq), Israeli businessman, billionaire, and former politician who served as a member of the Knesset between 1978 and 1981.
 Selim Zilkha (born 1927), entrepreneur who founded Mothercare, one of the United Kingdom's largest retail chains. He was born in Baghdad to an Iraqi Jewish family. He is currently the co-owner of Zilkha Biomass Energy, which owns timberland and which makes pellet biofuel in Texas.
 Bahaa Hariri, businessman. Son of former Lebanese Prime Minister Rafik Hariri and Iraqi mother (Nidal Al-Bustani).
 Samuel Hayek, Israeli millionaire real-estate tycoon of Iraqi Jewish descent.
 Badr Jafar, business executive and entrepreneur based in the United Arab Emirates
 Victor Nacif, businessman and current Vice President of Design Business Aspects for Nissan Design America. He is of Mexican, Lebanese and Iraqi ancestry.
 Vincent Tchenguiz (born October 1956), Iranian-British entrepreneur born in Tehran to an Iraqi-Jewish family. He is the Chairman of Consensus Business Group.
 Robert Tchenguiz, British entrepreneur, securities dealer and the brother of Vincent Tchenguiz. He was born Teheran to an Iraqi-Jewish family. He is the Co-chairman of Rotch Property Group.
 Ghadir Razuki, British multi-millionaire of Iraqi parents. Founder of TNT Magazine Group, with magazine and media interests in the UK, Australia, New Zealand and South Africa.
 Pnina Rosenblum, Israeli businesswoman, model and media personality, who has also been involved in politics.
 Kevork Hovnanian (1923 – September 24, 2009), Iraqi-born Armenian-American businessman and home builder, founder of Hovnanian Enterprises in 1959. He remained the president and chief executive officer of Hovnanian Enterprises until his retirement in 1997
 Charles Saatchi (born 9 June 1943 in Baghdad), co-founder of the PR agency called M&C Saatchi. He is also known as an art collector and owner of the Saatchi Gallery.
 Michael Kadoorie, The Hon. Sir Michael David Kadoorie, GBS (born 1941, Hong Kong), business executive and philanthropist.
 Sir Albert Abdullah David Sassoon, 1st Baronet (25 July 1818 – 24 October 1896), British Indian philanthropist and merchant, born in Baghdad
 David and Simon Reuben, joint Chief Executives of Reuben Brothers, well-known British businessmen and philanthropists. 
 David Sassoon, Indian merchant and banker; born at Bagdad Oct., 1792; died at Bombay Nov. 7, 1864. His father, a wealthy Mesopotamian merchant, for many years state treasurer to the Turkish governor of Baghdad
 Majid Jafar, businessman of Iraqi origin and the CEO of Crescent Petroleum.
 Edward Isaac Ezra (3 January 1882 in Shanghai – 15 December 1921 in Shanghai), wealthy Jewish businessman of a Baghdadi Jewish family.
 Lawrence Kadoorie, Baron Kadoorie (2 June 1899 in Hong Kong – 25 August 1993 in Hong Kong), famous industrialist, hotelier, and philanthropist. His family were originally Mizrahi Jews from Baghdad who later migrated to Bombay (Mumbai), India in the mid-eighteenth century. 
 Elly Kadoorie, Eleazer Silas Kadoorie, known as Sir Elly Kadoorie (1867 – August 2, 1944), philanthropist and member of a wealthy family that had large business interests in the Far East. 
 Ellis Kadoorie (1865–1922), Hong Kong businessman and philanthropist. He was a member of the wealthy Baghdadian Kadoorie family that had large business interests in the Far East.
 Silas Aaron Hardoon (1851–1931), wealthy businessman and well-known public figure in the city of Shanghai in the early 20th century.

Comedians
 Brian Awadis, also known as FaZe Rug
 Remy Munasifi, also known as GoRemy

Educators

 Serapion the Younger, author of a notable medicinal-botany book entitled The Book of Simple Medicaments. The book is dated 12th or 13th century. He is called "the Younger" to distinguish him from Serapion the Elder, aka Yahya ibn Sarafyun.
 Salmawaih ibn Bunan (died 840), Arab Nestorian Christian physician who translated works of Galen from Greek into Arabic. 
 Yahya ibn Sarafyun (9th century), Assyrian physician, known in Europe as Johannes Serapion. 
 John bar Penkaye, Assyrian Nestorian Christian writer of the late 7th century. He lived at the time of fifth caliph of the Umayyad dynasty Abd al-Malik. His writings provides an eyewitness account of the Arab conquests of his time but make no mention of an Arab sacred book in existence by the end of the 7th century.
 Yahya Ibn Adi (893–974), Assyrian Christian philosopher, theologian and translator working in Arabic.  was born in Tikrit, north of Iraq. He translated numerous works of Greek philosophy into Arabic, mostly from existing versions in Syriac. He was buried in the Syriac church of St Thomas in Baghdad.
 Abu Bishr Matta ibn Yunus (870–20 June 940), Christian philosopher who played an important role in the transmission of the works of Aristotle to the Islamic world. He is famous for founding the Baghdad School of Aristotelian Philosophers.
 Sami Saeed Al Ahmed (1930–2006), historian and professor at the University of Denver 
 Abdul Jerri, Abdul Jabbar Hassoon Jerri (July 20, 1932), Iraqi American physicist and mathematician, most recognized for his contributions to information theory in general, in particular to the understanding of the Gibbs phenomenon. 
 Mohammed Albaaj born in Basra, Iraq, on December, 5, 2002) Philosopher researcher in the field of cosmological physics and philosophy.
 Omar Fakhri (born in Baghdad, Iraq, on October 18, 1934), B.Sc., M.Sc., Ph.D. FRCPath is a medical scientist who is best known for his research in several areas.
 Adil E. Shamoo (born in Baghdad, Iraq on August 1, 1941), Assyrian biochemist with an interest in biomedical ethics and foreign policy. He is a professor at the Department of Biochemistry and Molecular Biology at the University of Maryland.
 Ali Al-Wardi (born in Kadhimiya, Baghdad in 1913). He was an Iraqi Social Scientist specialized in the field of Social history. He earned his master's degree in 1948 from The University of Texas at Austin and his Ph.D. in 1950 from the same university. 
 Hirmis Aboona (1940 – April 19, 2009), educator and writer, Assyrian historian who was known for his publications concerning the history of the Assyrians in northern Iraq.
 Thomas L. Saaty (born 1926, Mosul, Iraq), professor at the University of Pittsburgh, where he teaches in the Joseph M. Katz Graduate School of Business. He is the inventor, architect, and primary theoretician of the Analytic Hierarchy Process (AHP)
 Emanuel Kamber, Assyrian physics professor at Western Michigan University and was the Secretary General of the Assyrian Universal Alliance. He was born in the small Assyrian village of Darbandikhan in Iraq.
 Majid Khadduri (September 27, 1909 – January 25, 2007), Iraqi–born founder of the Paul H. Nitze School of Advanced International Studies Middle East Studies program. Internationally, he was recognized as a leading authority on a wide variety of Islamic subjects, modern history and the politics of the Middle East. He was the author of more than 35 books in English and Arabic and hundreds of articles.
 Nouman Abid Al-Jader,  Mandaean chair of mathematics at Baghdad University; co-founded Iraqi Physics and Mathematics Society; acting dean of the College of Science at the University of Baghdad; University of Michigan (Ann Arbor) graduate (1950).
 Nadje Sadig Al-Ali, educator and writer
 Shmuel Moreh (born in Baghdad, December 22, 1932), professor emeritus in the Department for Arabic Language and Literature at the Hebrew University and a recipient of the Israel Prize in Middle Eastern studies in 1999.
 Abd al-Latif al-Baghdadi
 Behnam Afas (born 17 July 1934), Iraqi-New Zealander author and researcher. His studies are mostly in the role of the Christian scholars and missionaries in Iraq. 
 Azad Bonni, MD, PhD, Iraqi Professor in the Department of Neurobiology, Harvard Medical School.
 Amal Al Khedairy, academic, lecturer and founder and director of the cultural centre "Al Beit Al Iraqi" ("The Iraqi House")
 Alphonse Mingana, Assyrian theologian, historian, orientalist and former priest best known for collecting and preserving the Mingana Collection of ancient Middle Eastern manuscripts at Birmingham.
 Hind Rassam Culhane, chair of the Division of Social and Behavioral Sciences at Mercy College, New York.
 Kanan Makiya (born 1949), Iraqi academic. He is the Sylvia K. Hassenfeld Professor of Islamic and Middle Eastern Studies at Brandeis University. 
 Nada Shabout, Professor of Art History, lecturer
 Avi Shlaim, historian and emeritus professor of International Relations at the University of Oxford

Engineers and scientists

 Isa Kelemechi, (Mongolian: Isa Khelmerchi (Isa the Interpreter); Chinese (Ai-hsüeh) was an Assyrian Nestorian Christian scientist, and official at the Yuan court of Kublai Khan's Mongol Empire in the 13th century.
 Abd al-Latif al-Baghdadi
 Abu'l-Barakāt al-Baghdādī
 Abu'l-Hasan al-Uqlidisi
 Abdul Athem Alsabti, Mandaean supernova astrophysicist who introduced astronomy teaching into Iraq in 1970; University of Manchester graduate (1970); minor planet 10478 Alsabti named after him; founded Iraqi Astronomical Society; project leader for the Iraqi National Astronomical Observatory.
 Abdul Jabbar Abdullah, Mandaean wave theory physicist, dynamical meteorologist, and President Emeritus of Baghdad University; MIT graduate (1946); chair of physics at Baghdad University; co-founded Iraqi Physics and Mathematics Society.
 Ahmed ibn Yusuf, mathematician
 Al-Abbās ibn Said al-Jawharī
 Al-Karaji
 Al-Kindi (Alkindus)
 Al-Samawal al-Maghribi
 Ara Darzi, Baron Darzi of Denham, Ara Warkes Darzi, Baron Darzi of Denham, KBE PC, (born 7 May 1960), is one of the world's leading surgeons at Imperial College London, where he holds the Paul Hamlyn Chair of Surgery, specialising in the field of minimally invasive and robot-assisted surgery, having pioneered many new techniques and technologies.
 Azzam Alwash, is an Iraqi hydraulic engineer and environmentalist. He was awarded the Goldman Environmental Prize in 2013, in particular for his efforts on restoring salt marshs in southern Iraq, which had been destroyed during the Saddam Hussein regime.
 Berossus, Hellenistic-era Babylonian writer, priest of Bel Marduk and astronomer writing in Greek, active at the beginning of the 3rd century BC
 Brethren of Purity (Ikhwan al-Safa')
 Dlawer Ala'Aldeen, Founding President of the Middle East Research Institute (MERI); Former Minister of Higher Education & Scientific Research in Kurdistan Regional Government (2009–2012); Former Professor of Medicine in Nottingham University, UK (1992–2014); human right lobbyist
 Fakhri A. Bazzaz, plant ecologist
 Farouk Al-Kasim, a Norwegian-Iraqi petroleum geologist. He played a major role in the exploitation of Norway's petroleum resources within the Norwegian Petroleum Directorate.
 Lihadh Al-Gazali, geneticist
 Grigor Gurzadyan, Armenian astronomer, and pioneer of space astronomy, born October 15, 1922, in Baghdad to parents who fled in 1915 Western Armenia.
 Hunayn ibn Ishaq, scientist and physician
 Ibn al-Haytham (Alhacen/Alhazen)
 Ibn Sa'd al-Baghdadi
 Ibn Tahir al-Baghdadi
 Jafar Dhia Jafar, Iraqi nuclear physicist.
 Jim Al-Khalili, Iraqi-born British theoretical physicist, author and science communicator; professor of theoretical physics and chair in the Public Engagement in Science at the University of Surrey.
 Khidir Hamza, Iraqi nuclear physicist.
 Kidinnu
 Naburimannu
 Seleucus of Seleucia
 Sind ibn Ali
 Souad Naji Al-Azzawi Iraqi academic and environmentalist 
 Sudines, Babylonian sage, mentioned as one of the famous Chaldean mathematicians and astronomer-astrologers by later Roman writers like Strabo (Geografia 16:1–6).

Film actors and directors
 Amel Senan, (born October 22, 1966), Iraqi-Turkmen actress known for her role of Nadia of the 1988 Iraqi television series Nadia.
 Kasim Abid, London-based cameraman and director of Iraqi origin
 Mohamed Al-Daradji
 Nazem Al-Ghazali, actor/singer
 Koutaiba Al Janabi
 Namaa Alward, actress
 Naguib el-Rihani, actor
 Abbas Fahdel, director of Dawn of the World
 Tariq Hashim
 Sophia Jawad, actress and model based in the United Arab Emirates
 Hind Kamel, well-known Iraqi actress and film director now residing in Jordan.
 Saaed Khalifa, actor
 Farid Majari, film maker
 Dina Mousawi, actress
 Maysoon Pachachi, director of Return to the Land of Wonders
 Basam Ridha, actor
 Hiner Saleem, film director
 Saad Salman, film director known for his documentary Baghdad On/Off
 Samir, film director based in Switzerland, known for his documentary Forget Baghdad

Film actors and directors of Iraqi descent

Ibraham Alzubaidy, actor, director, and writer, born in Kut, Iraq in 1978. He studied at California State University, Northridge, majoring in Cinema and Television Art-Film Directing.
 Andy Serkis (born 20 April 1964), English film actor, director and author. His mother was half Iraqi and half English and taught disabled children. His father was an Iraqi gynaecologist of Armenian ethnicity. 
 David Chokachi (born David Al-Chokhachy on January 16, 1968, in Plymouth, Massachusetts), American film and television actor. He's best known for his role in the TV series Witchblade, Baywatch, and Beyond The Break. His father is Iraqi Turkmen and his mother is Finnish
 Michael Nouri, American television and film actor. He may be best known for his role as Nick Hurley, in the 1983 film Flashdance. Nouri was born in Washington, D.C., the son of Gloria (née Montgomery) and Edmond Nouri. His father was born in Baghdad in 1918. 
 Ruby Myers Sulochana (सुलोचना) (1907–1983), Indian silent film star of Jewish ancestry, hailing from the community of Baghdadi Jews in India. In her heyday she was one of the highest paid actresses of her time. 
 Layth Abdulamir
 Sasson Gabai (born 24 November 1947), Israeli actor. Gabai was born in Baghdad to an Iraqi Jewish family. During his childhood he immigrated together with his family to Israel.
 Uri Gavriel (born April 3, 1955), Israeli theater, film and TV actor. Uri Gavriel was born in 1955 in the Magdiel transit 
camp in Israel to the Iraqi Jewish immigrants Bertha and Gabriel Gavriel. 
 Joe Balass (born 1966 in Baghdad, Iraq), Iraqi Canadian film maker.
  Ahmad Harhash born July 20 2001 syrian Canadian Actor
 Dina Mousawi, actress of British/Iraqi origin
 Maysoon Pachachi (born September 17, 1947), film director, editor and producer of Iraqi origin. She was educated in Iraq, the U.S., Britain and can speak English, Arabic, French and Italian. She is the daughter of Iraqi politician Adnan Pachachi.
 Anja Al-Erhayem, filmmaker (Iraqi father/Danish mother)
 Ja'far 'Abd Al-Hamid, Iraqi-British filmmaker of "Mesocafe".
 Fajer Al-Kaisi, Iraqi-Canadian actor, now resides in the States.
 Dar Salim, Danish actor, born in Baghdad, Iraq in 1977. He played the role of Qotho, one of Khal Drogo's bloodriders, in Game of Thrones. 
 Lewis Alsamari, actor starred in the Universal Pictures film United 93
 Usama Alshaibi, director of Muhammad and Jane and Nice Bombs
 Amer Alwan, film director known for Zaman, The Man From The Reeds
 Joe Balass, film maker
 Claudia Basrawi, German actress and writer (German mother and Iraqi father)
 Carole Basri, filmmaker
 Zana Briski, director of Born into Brothels
 Selma Chalabi, film maker
 Brian George, British-Israeli actor, most famous role is as Pakistani restaurateur Babu Bhatt on Seinfeld. (Born to Baghdadi Jewish parents).
 Shosha Goren, actress and comedian
 Ishtar Yasin Gutierrez, film director (Iraqi father and Chilean mother)
 Yasmine Hanani, American actress featured in documentary films Voices of Iraq and My Country, My Country
 Don Hany, actor (Won Best Actor for Winning the Peace (2005)
 Parine Jaddo, Iraqi-American filmmaker of Rasta's Paradise
 Nicholas Kadi, actor, known for "Quest For Fire", "Navy Seals" and "George Of The Jungle".
 Chris Kattan, American comedian and actor, best known for his work on the sketch show Saturday Night Live. (Born to an Iraqi Jewish father and Hungarian Buddhist mother).
 Charlotte Lewis, actress most notable for her lead female role in The Golden Child alongside Eddie Murphy
 Anisa Mehdi, Emmy Award-winning film director, journalist and director of Inside Mecca
 Safia Monney, actress
 Yigal Naor, actor
 Rashed Radwan, Spanish film director
 Heather Raffo, playwright/actress most known for her role in 9 Parts of Desire
 Liat Ron, actress and dancer
 Mohamed Said (actor), Swedish actor
 Osamah Sami, actor
 Alia Shawkat, American actress known as Maeby Funke on Arrested Development
 Zina Zaflow, actress
 Nadira (Farhat Ezekiel Nadira (5 December 1932 – 9 February 2006), commonly known as Nadira, actress in Indian Bollywood cinema
 Amy Fadhli (born January 30, 1966, in Galveston, Texas), American fitness model, actress and winner of the Fitness America National Champion 1996. Her father is Iraqi, born in Baghdad, a cardiovascular surgeon, and her mother is Czech, a sculptor and breeder of Arabian horses.
 Randa Chahal Sabag, Lebanese film director, producer and screenwriter born to an Iraqi mother and Lebanese father.
 Abraham Sofaer (October 1, 1896 – January 21, 1988), stage actor of Burmese-Jewish descent who became a familiar supporting player on film and television in his later years. He was born in Rangoon.
 Salim Al-Basri (July 7, 1926, in Baghdad – May 8, 1997), Iraqi film director

Human rights activists
 Naziha al-Dulaimi (1923, Baghdad – 9 October 2007, Herdecke), early pioneer of the Iraqi feminist movement. She was a cofounder and first president of the Iraqi Women League 10-3-1952, the first woman minister in Iraq's modern history, and the first woman cabinet minister in the Arab world.
 Widad Akrawi, Danish writer, doctor, advocate for peace, human rights, justice and equality, co-founder of Defend International.
 Zainab Salbi (born 1969), Iraqi American author, women's rights activist, filmmaker, humanitarian and social entrepreneur who is founder and former CEO (1993-2011) of Washington-based Women for Women International.
Munjed Al Muderis (born 1972), Iraqi born Australian author, Australian ambassador of the red cross, human rights activist and refugee rights activist. Lives in Sydney / Australia.
 Dalal Khario (born circa 1997), Iraqi-German author and women's rights activist.
 Safaa Al Sarai (born 1993), human rights activist who has been called the icon of the Iraqi uprising.
 Worood Zuhair (born 1987), Iraqi feminist and women's rights activist and Biologist.

Journalists

 Alaa Al-Marjani (born 1967), photojournalist from Najaf, worked for Associated Press and is currently working with Reuters.
 Safa Khulusi (1917–1995), Iraqi historian, novelist, poet, journalist and broadcaster. He is known for mediating between Arabic- and English-language cultures, and for his scholarship of modern Iraqi literature.
 Talal Al-Haj, Iraqi Journalist. He is the current New York/United Nations Bureau Chief for the Al-Arabiya news network.
 Fadhil Al Azzawi, writer, journalist and translator
 Zuhair Al-Jezairy, journalist
 Atwar Bahjat, journalist and reporter murdered in Iraq
 Rauf Hassan, journalist and writer
 Bilal Hussein, photojournalist
 Salam Pax, blogger, translator and journalist
 Taher Thabet, journalist
 Ghaith Abdul-Ahad, unembedded Iraqi journalist

Journalists of Iraqi descent

 Lorraine Ali, reporter, editor and culture writer for many publications, including Newsweek. Ali was born to an Iraqi American father who immigrated from Baghdad to Los Angeles in the 1950s. Her mother is of French Canadian descent. 
 Leila Barclay, American journalist and storyteller
 Nina Burleigh, American writer and journalist. Burleigh has written about her visits to Iraq, her mother's country of birth, both as a child and later in life as a journalist.
 Dunja Hayali, German journalist and TV presenter
 Salam Karam, Swedish journalist, has reported for the newspaper Svenska Dagbladet and in the radio program Godmorgon, världen!.
 Farah Nosh, photojournalist
 Michelle Nouri, journalist and writer, her publications include "La ragazza di Baghdad" ("The girl in Baghdad").
 Daniel Pearl (1963–2002), American journalist, kidnapped and murdered in Karachi, Pakistan. (Born to an Iraqi Jewish mother).
 Tim Judah, reporter for The Economist and author.
 Sharif Hikmat Nashashibi, London-based journalist, analyst on Arab affairs, and co-founder and chairman of Arab Media Watch, a media watchdog organization that monitors and responds to British media coverage of the Arab world. Nashashibi was born in Kuwait to a Palestinian-Jordanian-Lebanese Muslim father and an Iraqi-Syrian Christian mother.

Rulers and military figures 

 Ashurbanipal
 Ashurnasirpal II
 Abdul Karim Qasim
 Hamid Raja Shalah
 Hammurabi
 Khalil Dabbagh
 Nebuchadrezzar II
 Sargon of Akkad
 Sargon II 
 Saladin
 Saddam Hussein
 Sennacherib
 Talib Shaghati

Other military figures
 Salah al-Din al-Sabbagh (1889–1945), Iraqi Army officer
 Hagop Hagopian, one of the founders and the main leader of the Armenian Secret Army for the Liberation of Armenia (ASALA).
 Toma Tomas, also known by his nom de guerre Abu Joseph, Assyrian politician and the leader of anti-government militias (al-Ansar) in northern Iraq during the 1960s and '70s.

Military figures of Iraqi origin

 J. F. R. Jacob (born 1923), retired Indian Army Lieutenant General. He is best known for the role he played in India's victory in the Indo-Pakistan War of 1971 and the Liberation of Bangladesh. He also fought in World War II and the Indo-Pakistan War of 1965. He later served as the Governor of the Indian states of Goa and Punjab. His family were Baghdadi Jews originally from Iraq who settled in Kolkata in the middle of the 18th century.
 Sybil Sassoon, Marchioness of Cholmondeley (30 January 1894, London – 26 December 1989, Cheshire), Chief Staff Officer to Director WRNS, WRNS HQ, Admiralty (HMS Pembroke III) from 12 November 1939 until 1946. On 9 February 1945 she was appointed as Supt. of the Women's Royal Naval Service (WRNS) and the following year was made CBE. She belonged to the prominent Sassoon and Rothschild families.

Misc

 Maria Theresa Asmar, known as Babylon's Princess in Europe, born in 1804 in Tel Keppe, Iraq, and died in France before the Franco-Prussian War, author of Memoirs of a Babylonian Princess, consisting of two volumes and 720 pages. This book was written in the early 19th century, describing her travels through Turkey, Syria, Lebanon, and Israel and the harem system used in Turkey.
 Dan Halutz, Israeli air force general
 Ibrahim Mohammed Khalil, Al Qaida operative in Germany
 Manisa Tarzanı, Tarzan of Manisa, pseudonym of Ahmet Bedewi (1899 Samarra, Iraq – 31 May 1963 in Manisa, Turkey). Living for 40 years on the mount Spil above Manisa, he is considered the first Turkish environmentalist.
 Moshe Levi (1936 – January 8, 2008), 12th Chief of Staff of the Israel Defense Forces, the first Chief of Staff of Mizrahi (Iraqi) origin.
 Zee M Kane (born 8 October 1982) to Iraqi father and English mother, Editor-in-Chief of the blog The Next Web, a Technorati Top 50 blog worldwide.
 Murad Meneshian (1936–2016), research chemist, journalist, translator, and researcher.
 Moshe Barazani (June 14, 1926 – April 21, 1947), Iraqi Kurdish Jew and a member of Lehi ("Freedom Fighters of Israel," aka the "Stern Gang"). 
 Yitzhak Mordechai, Israeli general and later Minister of Defense and Minister of Transport.
 Muayyed Nureddin, geologist
 Ibn Rajab, scholar
 Taban Shoresh, Iraqi Kurd, founder of The Lotus Flower charity
 Curtis Sliwa, American anti-crime activist, founder and CEO of the Guardian Angels, and radio talk show host and media personality.
 Nadya Suleman, Nadya Denise Doud-Suleman (born Natalie Denise Suleman July 11, 1975), known as Octomom in the media, is an American woman who came to international attention when she gave birth to octuplets in January 2009. Suleman's father, Edward Doud Suleman, identified himself as a former Iraqi military man and said he would be returning to his native Iraq as a translator and driver in order to financially support his daughter and her fourteen children.

Models, Miss Iraq and Beauty Pageant of Iraqi Descent 
 Klodia Hanna an Assyrian model and singer
Shimaa Qasim, model and winner of Miss Iraq 2015
Tara Fares a model and First Runner-up of Miss Iraq 2014
 Pramila (Esther Victoria Abraham), Indian actress. Pramila was the winner of the first Miss India contest, in 1947. 
 Somy Ali, former Bollywood actress and now model and journalist (Iraqi mother and Pakistani father)
 Amy Fadhli, fitness model, actress and winner of the "Fitness America National Champion 1996" (Iraqi father and Czech mother)
 Viola Haqi, Dutch-Iraqi model

Monarchs

 Hashemite Dynasty
 List of Kings of Iraq

Musicians

 Dalshad Said, Dohuk-born, Kurdish Iraqi contemporary violinist, currently residing in Austria where he teaches music and violin.

 Anwar Abdul Wahab (1946–), Iraqi singer.
 Ilham al-Madfai, Iraqi guitarist, singer and composer. al-Madfai's synthesis of Western guitar stylings with traditional Iraqi music has made him a popular performer in his native country and throughout the Middle East. 
 Rida Al Abdullah, Iraqi singer. Born in 1966 in Baghdad, Iraq.
 Acrassicauda, Iraqi thrash metal band formed in 2001. Members are Faisal Talal, Tony Aziz, Firas Al-Lateef, Marwan Riyadh and James Al Ansari (assyrian)
 Nazem Al-Ghazali, one of the most popular singers in the history of Iraq and his songs are still heard by many in the Arab world.
 Rahim AlHaj, Iraqi American oud musician and composer.
 Basim al-karbalaie
 Hussam Al-Rassam
 Kathem Al Saher, one of the most successful Arab singers in the Arab world
 Ashur Bet Sargis, Assyrian singer
 Jamil Bachir
 Munir Bashir
 Zakaria Abdulla, Kurdish pop music star. He is one of the most popular artists in Middle East. Zakaria was born in Hawler, Kurdistan region of Iraq.
 Seta Hagopian, famous Iraqi Armenian singer
 Klodia Hanna, singer and model
 Shatha Hassoun winner of Star Academy 4
 Bashar Lulua, orchestra conductor
 Majid Al Muhandis, Iraqi singer, was born in Baghdad, Iraq, and after his birth moved to live in Kuwait, Jahra Province. He lived there until the Iraqi invasion into Kuwait, and studied Engineering, hence the title Majid "Al Muhandis (المهندس)," which means "The Engineer" in Arabic. 
 Ahmed Mukhtar
 Beatrice Ohanessian (1927–2008), Iraqi pianist, notable for being Iraq's first concert pianist and first female composer. (Born in Baghdad, of Armenian origin).
 Salima Pasha (?-1974), well known Iraqi Jewish singer and dubbed as the most famous female singer since the early 1930s. She married fellow Iraqi singer and actor Nazem Al-Ghazali.
 Hanna Petros (1896–1958), Iraqi Assyrian composer and scholar, wrote numerous books and treatises over oriental music, Iraqi Maqams and Syriac hymnody.
 Janan Sawa, Iraqi Assyrian singer
 Linda George, Iraqi Assyrian singer
 Ashur Bet Sargis (Assyrian-Iraqi Singer)
 Naseer Shamma, renowned Iraqi musician and oud player.
 Nawfal Shamoun
 Salman Shukur
Motez, electronic music producer and DJ
 Sahar Taha, singer and artist
 Zaidoon Treeko (1961–), Mandaean Oud player, composer, and poet
 Unknown to No One, boyband
 Haitham Yousif, popular Iraqi singer
 Mansour Zalzal
 Ziryab
 Tara Jaff, Iraqi Kurdish musician. She founded Zipang, a storytelling group which focuses on stories from ancient Mesopotamia.

Musicians of Iraqi descent

 Moshe Peretz (born 10 May 1983), Israeli Mizrahi Pop singer-songwriter and composer. He is also currently serving as a judge for the first season of The X Factor Israel. He was born from a Moroccan father and an Iraqi mother.
 Rami Fortis (born July 7, 1954), or simply Fortis, Israeli rock singer. Born in Tel Aviv. Fortis is of Iraqi Jewish and Italqim origin.
 Lior Narkis (born November 8, 1976, in Holon, Israel), male Israeli singer. He was born to a mixed Iraqi and Serbian Jewish family.
 Yair Dalal, is an Israeli musician of Iraqi-Jewish descent.
 Elliott Yamin, Efraym Elliott Yamin (born July 20, 1978), American singer known for his hit single "Wait for You" and placing third on the fifth season of American Idol. Yamin was born in Los Angeles, California, to father Shaul Yamin, an Israeli Jew of Iraqi Jewish descent, and mother Claudette Goldberg Yamin, a Jewish American of Ashkenazi descent. 
 Stacey Solomon (born 4 October 1989), English singer, television presenter and reality TV star. Solomon was born in Dagenham, East London, the daughter of Fiona (née Nash), a nurse, and David Solomon, a photographer. Her father is from a Jewish family that had immigrated to England from Iraq and Poland. 
 Omar Bashir (musician) (born in 1970), Iraqi Hungarian Musician. His father, Munir Bashir, was considered to be the supreme master of the Arab maqamat scale system
 Robin Ghosh (born 1939 in Baghdad, Iraq), Bangladeshi musician and music composer. 
 Brian Elias (born 30 August 1948, Bombay, now Mumbai, India), British composer. 
 Hanan Alattar, American soprano opera singer
 Laith Al-Deen, German pop musician
 Farida Mohammad Ali, singer
 Nora Foss al-Jabri, Norwegian child singer
 Saleh and Daoud Al-Kuwaity
 Inbar Bakal, Israeli singer-songwriter of mixed Iraqi and Yemeni descent.
 Bruno Coulais, composer
 Yair Dalal
 Amir ElSaffar
 Rami Fortis, Israeli rock singer (Iraqi/Italian ancestry)
 Munir Bashir, musician
 Juliana Jendo, singer
 Klodia Hanna, singer
 Ashur Bet Sargis, singer
 Lowkey, British-Iraqi rapper
 Narcy, Iraqi-Canadian rapper
 Aida Nadeem, Iraqi-Danish musician
 Esma Redžepova, Romani Macedonian vocalist, songwriter, and humanitarian. Her grandfather was an Iraqi Jew.
 Shlomo, human beatbox and member of UK-hip hop act, Foreign Beggars
 TIMZ Iraqi-American rapper
 Naufalle Al Wahab, musician and rapper, founded the band Aïwa , appeared on The Dictator (soundtrack)
 Wamid Al Wahab, musician, founded the band Aïwa 
 Elliott Yamin
 Daron Malakian (born July 18, 1975), Armenian-American singer-songwriter.
 Roni Dalumi (born September 15, 1991), Israeli singer, won the final of Kochav Nolad 7 contest in August 2009
 Darin or Darin Zanyar (born June 2, 1987, in Stockholm, Sweden), more commonly known as Darin, a Swedish, Kurdish pop singer and songwriter of Kurdish descent.
 Loris Ohannes Chobanian (born April 17, 1933, to Armenian parents in Mosul, Iraq), accomplished Armenian-American composer of classical music.
 Khyam Allami

Patriarchs

  Ignatius Antony I Samheri (1801 - 1864) Patriarch of the Syriac Catholic Church from 1853 to 1864

Physicians and surgeons

 Abd al-Latif al-Baghdadi
 Abdulahad AbdulNour physician, humanitarian, elected to Council of Representatives of Iraq in 1937 and 1947.
 Hanna Khayat
 Munjed Al Muderis Iraqi born Australian Orthopaedic surgeon pioneering Robotic Limb technology for amputees.
 Bukhtishu, Assyrian physician
 Esagil-kin-apli, Babylonian ummânū, or chief scholar, author of the Diagnostic Handbook, Sakikkū (SA.GIG)
 Ibn Hubal
 Hunayn ibn Ishaq (Hunayn bar Ishaq), Assyrian Physician
 Al-Kindi
 Yuhanna Ibn Masawaih (Yuhanna Bit Msawaih), Assyrian physician
 Ibn Kammuna Sa'd ibn Mansur (Izz Al-dawla) Ibn Kammuna (d.1284), 13th Century Jewish physician, philosopher and critic of Islam who lived under the rule of the Mongols in Baghdad.

Politicians

 

 Thabit AbdulNour, Iraqi Politician, member of the Council of Representatives of Iraq in 1925 and 1930, diplomat
 Sinan Al Shabibi, Iraqi economist who served as the governor of the Central Bank of Iraq from September 2003 to October 2012.
 Nuri al-Said (1888–July 15, 1958), Iraqi politician during the British Mandate and during the Kingdom of Iraq. He served in various key cabinet positions, and served seven terms as Prime Minister of Iraq. 
 Sharif Ali bin al-Hussein, was born in 1956, in Baghdad, Iraq. He is currently the leader of the Iraqi Constitutional Monarchy political party and claims to be the legitimate heir to the position of King of Iraq, based on his relationship to the last monarch, the late King Faisal II.
 'Abd al-Ilah (14 November 1913 – 14 July 1958), cousin and brother-in-law of King Ghazi of the Kingdom of Iraq.
 Faisal II of Iraq (2 May 1935 – 14 July 1958), last King of Iraq. He reigned from 4 April 1939 until July 1958, when he was murdered during the 14 July Revolution together with numerous members of his family. 
 Ghazi of Iraq (2 May 1912 – 4 April 1939), King of the Hashemite Kingdom of Iraq from 1933 to 1939 having been briefly Crown Prince of the Kingdom of Syria in 1920. He was born in Mecca (in present-day Saudi Arabia), the only son of Faisal I, the first King of Iraq.
 Faisal I of Iraq (20 May 1885 – 8 September 1933), King of the Arab Kingdom of Syria or Greater Syria in 1920, and was King of Iraq from 23 August 1921 to 1933. He was a member of the Hashemite dynasty.
 Huzaima bint Nasser (1884–1935), Arabian princess, Sharifa of Mecca. She married the King Faisal I, son of the Sharif of Mecca and became queen of Iraq from 1921 to 1933.
 Aliya bint Ali (1911–December 21, 1950), Arabian princess and a queen consort of Iraq. She was the spouse of king Ghazi of Iraq and the queen mother of Faisal II of Iraq. She was the last queen of Iraq.
 Abd al-Rahman al-Bazzaz (1913–1973), politician, reformist, and writer. He was a pan-Arab nationalist and served as the Dean of Baghdad Law College and later as Prime Minister of Iraq.
 Arshad al-Umari, was born in Mosul, Iraq on April 8, 1888. He was the 28th and 41st Prime Minister of Iraq. 
 Naji al-Suwaydi (1882–1942), Iraqi politician who served as Prime Minister from November 1929 to March 1930.
 Talib Al-Naqib, known Iraqi politician, who became the first Minister of Interior in Iraq
 Khudayer Abbas
 Izzat Ibrahim ad-Douri
 Haidar al-Abbadi
 Ali Jawdat al-Aiyubi
 Mohammed A. Aldouri
 Iyad Allawi
 Alaudin Abdul-Saheb al-Alwan
 Jafar al-Askari (September 15, 1885 – October 29, 1936), served twice as prime minister of Iraq: from November 22, 1923, to August 3, 1924; and from November 21, 1926, to December 31, 1927.
 Nori al-Badran
 Ahmed Hassan al-Bakr
 Ahmed al-Barak
 Abd ar-Rahman al-Bazzaz
 Naseer al-Chaderchi
 Kamil Mubdir al-Gailani
 Ali Faik al-Ghadban
 Mohammed Shakir al-Ghanam
 Mahdi al-Hafidh
 Ali Al-Haidri
 Abdul Aziz al-Hakim
 Abdul Razak al-Hashimi
 Aqila al-Hashimi
 Yasin al-Hashimi
 Taha al-Hashimi
 Hajim al-Hassani
 Ibrahim al-Jaafari
 Mofeed Mohammed Jawad al-Jazaeri
 Rashid Ali al-Kaylani
 Abd ar-Rahman al-Haydari al-Kaylani
 Salama al-Khufaji
 Raja Habib al-Khuzaai
 Pascal Esho Warda
 Ali Abdul-Amir Allawi
 Ali Hassan al-Majid
 Sami Izara al-Majoun
 Nouri al-Maliki
 Naziha al-Dulaimi
 Jamil al-Midfai
 Abdel-Karim Mahoud al-Mohammedawi
 Rashid al-Rifai
 Mowaffak al-Rubaie
 Muqtada al-Sadr
 Muhammad Saeed al-Sahhaf
 Ayham al-Samaraie
 Hussain al-Shahristani
 Hashim Abdul-Rahman al-Shibli
 Tawfiq al-Suwaidi (1892–October 15, 1968), Iraqi politician who served as Prime Minister of Iraq on three occasions stretching from 1929 to 1950.
 Abd al-Muhsin as-Sa'dun (1879–November 13, 1929), Iraqi politician who served as Prime Minister of Iraq on four separate occasions between 1922 and 1929.
 Sultan Hashim Ahmad al-Tai
 Rafi' Dahham Al-Tikriti, Chief Iraqi Intelligence Service
 Barzan Ibrahim al-Tikriti
 Sabawi Ibrahim al-Tikriti
 Watban Ibrahim al-Tikriti
 Mohammed Bahr al-Uloum
 Ibrahim Mohamed Bahr al-Uloum
 Ghazi Mashal Ajil al-Yawer
 Dara Noor Alzin
 Abdul Rahman Arif
 Abdul Salam Arif
 Muhammad Najib ar-Ruba'i
 Abd al-Muhsin as-Sa'dun
 Nuri as-Said
 Zeyad Abdul-Razzaq Mohammed Aswad
 Tariq Aziz, Mikhail Yuhanna baptized Manuel Christo; born 28 April 1936, was the Foreign Minister (1983–1991) and Deputy Prime Minister (1979 – 2003) of Iraq and a close advisor of former President Saddam Hussein. He is in fact an ethnic Assyrian, and a member of the Chaldean Catholic Church.
 Salaheddine Bahaaeddin
 Massoud Barzani
 Nesreen Mustafa Sidiq Berwari
 Ahmed Chalabi (born 30 October 1944), Iraqi politician. He was interim oil minister in Iraq. 
 Sondul Chapouk
 Sassoon Eskell
 Ali Fadel
 Aras Habib
 Mohsen Abdel Hamid
 Saddam Hussein
 Hussein Kamel al-Majid
 Hatem Kamil
 Abdul-Rahman Sidiq Kareem
 Lamiya Abed Khadawi
 Mohammed Jassem Khudair
 Wael Abdul Latif
 Samir Shakir Mahmoud
 Abdul-Wahab Mirjan
 Hamid Majid Mousa
 Rashad Mandan Omar
 Mahmoud Othman
 Adnan Pachachi
 Behnam Zayya Polis
 Abdul Karim Qassim
 Mohammed Tawfik Raheem
 Abdul-Ameer Abboud Rahima
 Taha Yassin Ramadan
 Abdul-Latif Rashid
 Naji Sabri
 Barham Salih
 Ezzedine Salim
 David Sassoon
 Talib Shabib
 Naji Shawkat
 Bakr Sidqi
 Bayan Baqir Solagh
 Hikmat Sulayman
 Jalal Talabani
 Abdul-Basit Turki
 Haitham Rashid Wihaib
 Hoshyar Zebari
 Mohammed Amza Zubeidi
 Jalal Dabagh
 Aiham Alsammarae, Iraqi politician who served as Minister of Electricity from August 2003 until May 2005. 
 Rend al-Rahim Francke (born 1949), Iraqi political activist. She held the position as Iraqi ambassador to the United States. She is considered to be a secularist trying to enable Iraq to transition to a liberal democratic model.

Politicians of Iraqi descent

 Faris Al-Rawi (born 2 May 1971), Trinidadian politician and a member of the People's National Movement, also Member of Parliament (MP) for San Fernando West and Attorney General of Trinidad and Tobago since 2015. Born in San Fernando to a Trinidadian mother and Iraqi father.
Sir Philip Sassoon, 3rd Baronet (4 December 1888 – 3 June 1939), British politician, art collector and social host. Sassoon was a member of the prominent Jewish Sassoon family and Rothschild family. His father was Sir Edward Albert Sassoon, 2nd Baronet.  His sister was Sybil Sassoon, who married the Marquess of Cholmondeley. He was a cousin of the war poet Siegfried Sassoon.
 Maurice Saatchi, Baron Saatchi (born 21 June 1946), Iraqi-British politician and founder of the advertising agencies Saatchi and Saatchi and M&C Saatchi.
 Andrew Rohan, MP (born 1948 in Iraq), Australian politician, is a member of the New South Wales Legislative Assembly representing Smithfield for the Liberal Party of Australia since 2011
 Nadhim Zahawi, British Conservative Party politician who has been the Member of Parliament (MP) for Stratford-on-Avon since 2010. 
 Aryeh Bibi (born 28 April 1943 in Baghdad, Iraq), Israeli politician who served as a member of the Knesset for Kadima between 2009 and 2013.
 Anood Al-Samerai, British Southwark councillor for the Liberal Democrats. (Born to an Iraqi father and British mother).
 Binyamin Ben-Eliezer, Israeli politician and former soldier, the first Iraqi Jew to lead the Israeli Labor Party.
 José Murat Casab, born to Iraqi immigrants, Mexican politician and a member of the Institutional Revolutionary Party also former Governor of Oaxaca.
 Ra'anan Cohen, former Israeli politician who served as a government minister during the early 2000s.
 Ran Cohen, Israeli politician and Knesset member for Meretz-Yachad. (Born in Baghdad to Iraqi parents)
 Saad Hariri, Lebanese Legislator (2005–), son of Rafik Hariri and an Iraqi mother.
 Dalia Itzik, Israeli politician affiliated with the Kadima party. She took office as the first female speaker of the Knesset on 4 May 2006.
 David Saul Marshall, the leader of the Singapore Labour Front and became the first Chief Minister of Singapore in 1955, born into an Orthodox Jewish family of Iraqi ancestry in Singapore.
 Eliyahu Navi, mayor of Beersheba, Israel, born in Basra.
 Ebrahim Daoud Nonoo, former member of the National Assembly of Bahrain and currently the CEO of the Basma.
 Houda Nonoo, politician and current Bahraini Ambassador to the United States, of Iraqi Jewish origin.
 Anna Eshoo, U.S. Representative for California's 14th congressional district, serving since 1993, a member of the Democratic Party, the only member of Congress of Assyrian descent.
 Esabelle Dingizian (born in Baghdad in 1962), Swedish Green Party politician, member of the Riksdag since 2006.
 Murad Artin (born 6 January 1960 in Iraq), Swedish politician and Left Party member who worked in the Riksdag from 1998 to 2002
 Les Gara, Democratic member of the Alaska House of Representatives, representing the 23rd District since 2003.
 Franso Hariri (1937–February 18, 2001), Assyrian politician, high ranking and long-standing Kurdistan Democratic Party of Iraq member and head of the KDP block of Iraqi Kurdistan National Assembly.
 Fawzi Hariri (1958 Arbil, Iraq), Iraq's Minister of Industry and Minerals, sworn in on May 20, 2006.
 David Marshall (Singaporean politician) (12 March 1908 – 12 December 1995), politician and lawyer from Singapore who served as Singapore's first Chief Minister from 1955 to 1956. Born into an Orthodox Jewish family descended from Indian Baghdadi Jews in Singapore.

Sports personalities

 Bassim Abbas, footballer
Gezi Cohen (born 1938), Israeli Olympic weightlifter
 Fareed Lafta (Arabic:, فريد لفتة), Iraqi pilot and athlete, the first qualified cosmonaut from Iraq, and has appeared in Guinness World Records for participating in the first skydive above Mount Everest.
 Ali Adnan Kadhim, Iraqi footballer who plays as a left back for the Vancouver Whitecaps of Major League Soccer (MLS). Adnan was the 2013 Asian Young Footballer of the Year and often referred to as "Asia's Gareth Bale.”
 Haidar Abdul-Razzaq, footballer
 Yaser Kasim, Yaser was born 10 May 1991 in Baghdad. He is an Iraqi footballer who plays as Midfielder for Swindon Town F.C. in English League One.
 Ahmed Yasin Ghani, Iraqi footballer who plays as a midfielder for Örebro SK. His nickname is Örebro Talent, in Iraq he is also known as the Iraqi Cristiano Ronaldo.
 Haidar Aboodi, footballer
 Nashat Akram (born 12 September 1984 in Al Hillah, Babylon, Iraq), Iraqi professional footballer who plays for Dalian Aerbin in the Chinese Super League.
 Najah Ali, Iraqi boxer who qualified for the 2004 Olympics in Athens
 Adnan Al-Kaissie, professional wrestler
 Abdul Wahid Aziz, Iraqi weightlifter, who won a bronze medal in the lightweight division at the 1960 Summer Olympics.
 Ammo Baba, former Iraqi international football player and coach of the Iraq national football team.
 Youra Eshaya, footballer
 Faisal Faisal, footballer
 Basil Gorgis, footballer
 Jassim Muhammad Haji, footballer
 Humam Tariq, footballer
 Falah Hassan, footballer
 Louay Salah Hassan, footballer
 Khaldoun Ibrahim, footballer
 Salih Jaber, footballer
 Abbas Obeid Jassim, footballer
 Mahdi Karim, footballer
 Younis Mahmoud, Iraqi football striker and captain of the Iraq national football team. In 2007 he captained the Iraq football team to the Asian Cup glory. He currently plays for Al-Gharafa Sports Club in Qatar.
 Justin Meram, Iraqi national soccer team player
 Ahmad Mnajed, Iraqi national soccer team player, who plays for Al-Ansar in Lebanon.
 Emad Mohammed, footballer
 Karrar Jassim Mohammed, footballer
 Hawar Mulla Mohammed, Iraqi footballer, known to be one of the best players in Iraqi national team, currently plays for Anorthosis FC in Cyprus.
 Sarhang Muhsin, footballer
 Samal Saeed Mujbel, footballer
 Qusay Munir, Former Iraqi national football team player. Now manages Al-Diwaniya FC.
 Mohammad Nasser, Iraqi national football team player. Plays for Esteghlal Ahvaz in Iran.
 Yassir Raad, footballer
 Ahmed Radhi (born on April 21, 1964, in Baghdad, Iraq, but originally from Basra), former Iraqi football player and a current politician. 
 Ali Rehema, footballer
 Noor Sabri, footballer
 Salih Sadir, footballer
 Hussein Saeed, footballer
 Edison David, born in Iraq, Iraqi Assyrian football player who played for Iraq and Al-Quwa Al-Jawiya in the 1950s and 1960s
 Kadhem Sharif, Iraqi world-class wrestler and weightlifter
Hana Shezifi (born 1943), Israeli Olympic runner
 Abdul-Razzaq Ahmed Taha, Iraqi chess player and former president of Iraqi Chess Federation.
 Thamer Yousif, footballer
 Saadi Toma (born 25 April 1955 in Baghdad), Iraqi Assyrian former football player and coach.
 Peter Murad, former football player of Al-Minaa, Manchester United and Iraq national team.
 Humam Tariq, Iraq national team footballer

Sports personalities of Iraqi descent
 Justin Meram (born 1988), American/Iraqi soccer player currently playing for the Columbus Crew in Major League Soccer.
 Frans Dhia Putros (born July 14, 1993, in Aarhus, Denmark), Danish/Iraqi professional football player who primarily plays as a right back for FC Fredericia.
 Moshe Agami, former Israeli professional soccer player best known for his time with Maccabi Haifa F.C.
 Andreas Haddad (born Andreas Daniel Gabriel Turander on 5 May 1982), Assyrian Swedish football striker from Sweden who currently plays for Swedish side Hammarby. He has yet to earn a call up to the Swedish national football team and can thus play for Turkey or Iraq should he choose one of them.
 Frans Dhia Putros, Danish/Iraqi professional football player who primarily plays as a right back for FC Fredericia.
 Riyadh Al-Azzawi, Iraqi-British kickboxer and the 2008 World Kickboxing Network World Champion.
 Rabeh Al-Hussaini, Iraqi-Filipino basketball player for Ateneo Blue Eagles.
 Faris Al-Sultan, German professional triathlete and winner of the 2005 Ironman Triathlon. Born in Munich to a German mother and Iraqi father.
 Avram Grant, former football manager of Chelsea F.C. His mother is an Iraqi Jew.
 Shwan Jalal, Iraqi-English football goalkeeper.
 Bovar Karim, Iraqi-Swedish footballer who currently plays for Tromsø IL in Norwegian Premier League.
 Karo Murat, World Rated Boxer of Armenian Iraqi Origin
 Christer Youssef (born 1987), Swedish footballer of Assyrian descent who plays for Assyriska FF as a midfielder
 Joseph Judah (born December 13, 1984), American Canadian fighting in the junior middleweight division. 
 Daniel Judah (born in Brooklyn, New York), American southpaw professional cruiserweight and light heavyweight boxer.
 Zab Judah (born October 27, 1977), American professional boxer. 
 Josiah Judah (born August 21, 1978), professional boxer. His ring nickname is "Gorilla."
 Yoel Judah (born 1956?), eldest member of the Brooklyn-based Judah boxing family.

Television and radio personalities

 Rosil Al Azawi (born January 11, 1987, in Sharjah, UAE), Iraqi television presenter and model based in the United Arab Emirates.
 Jasim Al-Azzawi, Iraqi host, who presents the show Inside Iraq on Al Jazeera English
 Suhair al-Qaisi (born 1985 in Baghdad, Iraq), Iraqi news anchor for the Al Arabiya television station
 Laila Al Shaikhli, television presenter on Al Jazeera English
 Anwar Al-Hamadani, television presenter 
 Rola Bahnam, Lebanese TV presenter of an Iraqi descent. She is mostly known for working in Future TV. She was a former member of the Lebanese girl band, The 4 Cats in 1998
 Shaima Zubeir, television presenter
 Sama Dizayee (born 2 June 1988), Iraqi radio and television presenter.
 Sami Yako (born Dec 25th 1948 in Kirkuk, Iraq), lives in London, singer, comedy actor, producer and writer, works at a TV station in United Arab Emirates.

Television and radio personalities of Iraqi descent

 Alan Yentob (born 11 March 1947), British television executive and presenter. He has spent his entire career at the BBC. Alan Yentob was born into an Iraqi Jewish family in London.
 Kenza Braiga, French TV reality show star of Iraqi origin.
 Péri Cochin, television host (French of Lebanese/Iraqi ancestry)
 Eli Yatzpan, Israeli television host and comedian

Writers and poets

 Bahira Abdulatif, writer, translator and professor.
 Qusay Abd al-Ra'uf Askar, commonly known as Qusay al-Shaykh Askar (Arabic: قصي الشيخ عسكر) (born 1951)
 Nazik Al-Malaika (August 23, 1923, Baghdad, Iraq – 20 June 2007), Iraqi female poet and is considered by many to be one of the most influential contemporary Iraqi female poets. 
 Abd al-Wahhab Al-Bayati (December 19, 1926 – August 3, 1999), Iraqi poet. He was a pioneer in his field and defied conventional form of poetry that had been common for centuries.
Abdul Razzak Abdul Wahid (1930–2015), Mandaean poet.
 Saadi Yousef (born 1934 near Basra, Iraq), Iraqi author, poet, journalist, publisher, and political activist.
 Abd al-Wahhab Al-Bayati (December 19, 1926 – August 3, 1999), Iraqi poet. He was a pioneer in his field and defied conventional form of poetry that had been common for centuries.
 Ferhad Shakely (born 1951), prominent Kurdish writer, poet and researcher. He is one of the founders of modern Kurdish poetry in the post-Goran period. He was born in 1951 in the province of Kirkuk in Iraq.
 Muhammad Mahdi al-Jawahiri (26 July 1899 – 1 January 1997), famous Iraqi poet.
 Badr Shakir al-Sayyab (December 24, 1926 – 1964), Iraqi and Arab poet, born in Jekor, a town south of Basra in Iraq. was one of the greatest poets in Arabic literature, whose experiments helped to change the course of modern Arabic poetry.
 Lamia Abbas Amara (1929–2021), Mandaean poet and pioneer of modern Arabic poetry.
 Rabia Basri, Rābiʻa al-ʻAdawiyya al-Qaysiyya (Arabic: رابعة العدوية القيسية) or simply Rābiʿah al-Baṣrī (Arabic: رابعة البصري) (717–801 C.E.) was a female Muslim saint and Sufi mystic. 
 Enheduanna, Akkadian princess as well as High Priestess of the Moon god Nanna (Sin). Enheduanna composed 42 hymns addressed to temples across Sumer and Akkad including Eridu, Sippar and Esnunna
 Amira Hess, Israeli poet and artist. She arrived to Israel in 1951 from Baghdad Iraq.
 Haifa Zangana (born 1950 in Baghdad, Iraq), Iraqi novelist, author, artist, and political activist, best known for writing Women on a Journey: Between Baghdad and London.
 Daisy Al-Amir, Iraqi writer, poet and novelist. She is author of The Waiting List: An Iraqi Woman's Tales of Alienation has renowned her as one of the leading female writers of Iraq. She was born in Basra in 1935.
 Sargon Boulus (1944–2007), Iraqi-Assyrian poet and short story writer
 Walid al-Kubaisi, writer
 Thura Al Windawi, author
 Jamil Sidqi al-Zahawi, poet and philosopher
 Inaam Kachachi (born 1942), Iraqi journalist and author
 Al-Hariri of Basra, Iraqi poet, scholar of the Arabic language and high government official of the Seljuk Empire.
 Hafsa Bikri, poet
 Ya'qub Bilbul, writer
 Naeim Giladi, Anti-Zionist, author of an autobiographical article and historical analysis titled The Jews of Iraq. The article later formed the basis for his originally self-published book Ben-Gurion's Scandals: How the Haganah and the Mossad Eliminated Jews.
 Jamal Jumá, poet and researcher
 Betool Khedairi, author
 Farida Khalaf, ISIS escapee and author
 Moshe Levy, author
 Alia Mamdouh, author
 Sami Michael, author
 Dunya Mikhail, poet
 Samir Naqqash, novelist, short-story writer, and playwright 
 Abu Nuwas (750–810), born in Ahvaz, of Arab and Persian descent, one of the greatest of classical Arabic and Persian poets.
 David Rabeeya (born 1938), author and professor of Hebrew and Judaic Studies.
 Mahmoud Saeed, novelist
 Samuel Shimon, Iraqi author and journalist, was born into an Assyrian Iraqi family in Habbaniya in 1956. He is a co-founder of Banipal magazine. His autobiographical novel (An Iraqi in Paris), was published in Arabic in 2005, and a limited first edition in English translation was published the same year.
 Rena Kirdar Sindi, author and party hostess (born in Baghdad).
 Reuven Snir, writer
 Haifa Zangana, novelist, author and artist

Writers and poets of Iraqi descent

 'Atika Wahbi al-Khazraji (1924–1997), poet.
 Abdul Rahman Munif (1933–2004), one of the most important Arabic novelists of the 20th century, born in Amman to an Iraqi mother and Saudi father.
 Abraham Yahuda (1877–1951), Jewish writer, teacher and linguist, born in Jerusalem to a Jewish family originally from Baghdad.
 Achmed Khammas, German writer (Iraqi/German heritage)
 Alia Mamdouh (born 1944 in Baghdad, Iraq), Iraqi novelist, author and journalist living in exile in Paris, France. She won the 2004 Naguib Mahfouz Medal for Literature for her novel The Loved Ones.
 Alise Alousi, Iraqi-American poet
 Alon Ben-Meir, professor, writer, the Middle East Project director at the World Policy Institute
 Amira Hess, Israeli poet and artist
 Ari Ben-Menashe, Israeli author of Profits of War: Inside the Secret U.S.-Israeli Arms Network
 Armand Nassery, author and filmmaker.
 Eli Amir, Israeli writer and activist.
 Ella Habiba Shohat, Professor of Cultural Studies at New York University.
 Greg Patent, author, born in Hong Kong to a Russian father and Iraqi mother
 Jack Marshall (author), poet and author
 Khalid al-Maaly, German-Iraqi writer, poet and publisher
Hassan Abdulrazzak, Iraqi-British playwright. 
 Leilah Nadir, Iraqi-Canadian writer who grew up in England and Canada with an Iraqi father and an English mother. 
 Loolwa Khazzoom, Iraqi American Jewish writer who writes about Jewish multiculturalism and the cultural traditions.
 Lorraine Ali, American reporter, editor, culture writer and music critic for Newsweek.
 M.T. Mehdi (1928–1999), Iraqi-American writer and pro-Palestinian activist.
 Michelle Nouri, Italian journalist and author. She was born in Prague, Czech Republic, in 1973 to an Iraqi father and Czech mother. 
 Naïm Kattan, Canadian novelist, essayist and critic.
 Rachel Shabi, author and contributing writer to The Guardian. Shabi was born to Iraqi Jewish parents.
 Rachel Wahba, writer
 Raed Jarrar, writer, architect and human rights activist
 Ronny Someck, Israeli poet
 Sami Michael, Israeli author and the president of The Association for Civil Rights in Israel.
 Shant Kenderian, notable as an Iraqi-born United States citizen who became an American prisoner-of-war after being forced to fight against the United States in the Persian Gulf War
 Siegfried Loraine Sassoon (8 September 1886 – 1 September 1967), eminent English poet, writer, and soldier. Decorated for bravery on the Western Front, he became one of the leading poets of the First World War. His father, Alfred Ezra Sassoon (1861–1895), son of Sassoon David Sassoon, was a member of the wealthy Baghdadi Jewish Sassoon merchant family.
 Sinan Antoon (born 1967) (Arabic: سنان أنطون), Iraqi poet, novelist, scholar, and an associate professor at the Gallatin School of Individualized Study, New York University. He was featured in the 2003 documentary film About Baghdad, which he also co-directed.
 Suzanne Alaywan, poet and painting artist, born in Beirut to a Lebanese father and Iraqi mother
 Zainab Salbi, writer, activist, co-founder and president of Women for Women International
 Zuhur Dixon (1933–2021), poet

Religious figures 

 Ignatius Peter IV (1798 - 1894) 116th Patriarch of Syrian Orthodox Church of Antioch and Supreme Head of the Syriac Orthodox Church in the World
  Ignatius Antony I Samheri (1801 - 1864) Patriarch of the Syriac Catholic Church from 1853 to 1864
 Ignatius Aphrem I Barsoum (1887 - 1957) 120th Patriarch of Syrian Orthodox Church of Antioch and Supreme Head of the Syriac Orthodox Church in the World
 Ignatius Jacob III (1913 - 1980) 121st Patriarch of Syrian Orthodox Church of Antioch and Supreme Head of the Syriac Orthodox Church in the World
 Ignatius Zakka I (1931 - 1914) 122nd Patriarch of Syrian Orthodox Church of Antioch and Supreme Head of the Syriac Orthodox Church in the World
 Abo of Tiflis, Patron Saint of Tbilisi, Georgia
 Andraos Abouna (March 23, 1943 – July 27, 2010), Roman Catholic auxiliary bishop of Hirta and the auxiliary bishop of the Chaldean Catholic Patriarchate of Babylon.
 Shimon Agassi (1852–1914), Hakham and Kabbalist
 Asenath Barzani (1590–1670), renowned Kurdish Jewish woman who lived in Mosul, Iraq, daughter of the illustrious Rabbi Samuel Barzani, studied Kabbalah.
 Raphael I Bidawid, patriarch of the Chaldean Catholic Church, 1989–2003, Syriac scholar.
 Louis Cheikhô (1859 – 1927), ethnic Assyrian Orientalist and Theologian, considered as a major contributor and pioneer of the rediscovery of the Eastern Rite Christian heritage.
 Paul II Cheikho, patriarch of the Chaldean Catholic Church from 1958–1989, born on November 19, 1906, in Alqosh
 Emmanuel III Delly, Patriarch of Babylon of the Chaldeans and Primate of the Chaldean Catholic Church.
 Mar Dinkha IV, current Catholicos-Patriarch of the Assyrian Church of the East.
 Ganzibra Dakheel Edan (1881–1964), patriarch and international head of the Mandaeans from 1917, until his death in 1964
 Mordechai Eliyahu, former Sephardi Chief Rabbi of Israel
 Yosef Hayyim (1 September 1835 – 30 August 1909), leading hakham, authority on Jewish law (Halakha) and Master Kabbalist. He is best known as author of the work on Halakha Ben Ish Ḥai. Rav Yosef Chaim was born in Baghdad where his father, Hakham Eliyahu Chaim, was the active leader of the Jewish community.
 Rishama Sattar Jabbar Hilo, current patriarch and head of the Mandaeans in Iraq.
 Abraham Hillel, Chief Rabbi of Baghdad
 Jules Mikhael Al-Jamil, Archbishop Jules Mikhael Al-Jamil was born in Bakhdida on November 18, 1938 – dies in Rome, Italy on December 3, 2012). He was the Syriac Catholic titular archbishop of Tagritum and the auxiliary bishop.
 Yitzchak Kaduri, renowned Mizrahi Orthodox Haredi rabbi and kabbalist
 Anastas Al-Karmali, Anastas the Carmelite (5 Aug 1866 – 1947 Jan 7), Christian priest, most famed for his contributions to the field of Arabic linguistics.
 Mani, prophet and the founder of Manichaeism, a gnostic religion.
 Yitzhak Nissim (1896–1981), former Sephardic Chief rabbi of Israel
 Rabban Bar Sauma (c. 1220–1294) also known as Rabban Ṣawma or Rabban Çauma,(Chinese: 拉賓掃務瑪), "Nestorian" monk turned diplomat of the Church of the East faith.
 Shah Mustafa, renowned preacher associated with the spread of Islam in Bangladesh
 Yahballaha III (1245–November 13, 1317), known in earlier years as Rabban Marcos or Markos, was Patriarch of the Church of the East from 1281 to 1317. 
 Mohammad Baqir al-Hakim (1939-2003), Islamic scholar and politician.
 Muqtada al-Sadr
 Fadhil al-Milani - (born 1944), religious leader and scholar
 Ali al-Sistani (born 1930),  Twelver Shia Grand Ayatollah and marja'. Described as the spiritual leader of Shia Muslims worldwide, and one of the most senior scholars in Shia Islam.

 Ali Hassani Baghdadi (born 1955), twelver Shi'a Marja.
 Hussein Al-Sadr (born 1952), Grand Ayatollah and high-ranking Muslim religious scholar.

See also
 List of Assyrians
 List of British Iraqis
 List of Iraqi Americans

References

 Lists of Iraqis